Eleni Diamanti is a Greek engineer who is a researcher at the French National Centre for Scientific Research (CNRS). Diamanti serves as Vice Director of the Paris Centre for Quantum Computing. She was awarded a European Research Council Starting Grant in 2018.

Early life and education 
Diamanti is from Greece. She was an undergraduate student at the National Technical University of Athens, where she majored in electrical and computer engineering. She moved to the United States for graduate studies, joining Stanford University as a Master's student. She remained at Stanford for her doctoral research, where she looked at the implementation of phase shift quantum key distribution systems. After graduating, Diamanti returned to Europe, where she joined Institut d'Optique as a Marie Skłodowska-Curie Actions Fellow. She completed her habilitation at the Paris Diderot University in 2014.

Research and career 
Diamanti was appointed to the faculty at the French National Centre for Scientific Research (CNRS) in 2009. Her research considers experimental quantum cryptography and the development of photonics sources for quantum networks. Alongside developing encryption software using quantum technology, Diamanti was made Vice Director of the Paris Center for Quantum Computing. In this capacity she takes part in the European Union Quantum Flagship. She was awarded a Prime d'Excellence Scienitifique from the CNRS in 2013. In 2018 Diamanti was awarded a European Research Council Starting Grant.

Selected publications

References 

Living people
Year of birth missing (living people)
Greek women engineers
Greek computer scientists
National Technical University of Athens alumni
Stanford University alumni
Research directors of the French National Centre for Scientific Research